Pointe Coupee Parish School Board is a school district headquartered in unincorporated Pointe Coupee Parish, Louisiana, United States.

The district serves Pointe Coupee Parish.

One of its former members, from District F, is current State Representative Major Thibaut of District 18, which includes Iberville, West Baton Rouge, West Feliciana, and Pointe Coupee parishes.

Schools

7-12 schools
 Livonia High School (Livonia)
  Stem Magnet Academy (Morganza La.)

K-8 schools

 Rougon Elementary School (Unincorporated area)
 Upper Pointe Coupee Elementary School (Unincorporated area)

K-6 schools
 Valverda Elementary School (Unincorporated area)

K-5 schools
 Rosenwald Elementary School (New Roads)

Former schools

High schools
Transferred to other ownership
Pointe Coupee Central High School (became a charter school in 2008)
Closed
Innis High School
Morganza High School
Poydras High School
Rosenwald High School (at a previous point New Roads High School) - Merged into Pointe Coupee Central High School in 1991
Rougon High School - Merged into Pointe Coupee Central High School in 1991
Upper Pointe Coupee High School (at a previous point Batchelor High School) - Merged into Pointe Coupee Central High School in 1991

References

External links
 Pointe Coupee Parish School Board

School districts in Louisiana
School Board